Mehmet Ali Demirtaş (born 2 March 1951 in Bingöl Gökçedal Deşti village close to Yayladere) is a Turkish former wrestler who competed in the 1972 Summer Olympics.

He currently resides in Offenburg Germany and is the owner of the Turkish Pascha Restaurant.

References

External links
 

1951 births
Living people
Olympic wrestlers of Turkey
Wrestlers at the 1972 Summer Olympics
Turkish male sport wrestlers
Place of birth missing (living people)